Coleraine High School was an all-girls' grammar school located in Coleraine, County Londonderry, Northern Ireland. The High School, or Gordonville Ladies' Academy as it was originally known, was founded in 1875 in Alexander Terrace, Coleraine, by Mrs Long, assisted by her daughter and staff.

From 1924 until 1959, the school, as a voluntary grammar school, was controlled by a board of governors. In 1959, the day school was transferred to the County Londonderry Education Committee, and then, in the local government re-organisation of 1973, to the North Eastern Education and Library Board as a controlled grammar school. The Boarding Department remained the responsibility of the Board of Governors until its closure in 1997. The school moved from the "Gordonville" site in 1966 when the present buildings were completed and a further extension was added in 1971. It was once home to both boarders and day pupils. Now with the boarding department closed there are over 800 day pupils.

Coleraine High School merged with Coleraine Academical Institution to form Coleraine Grammar School.

Houses 
The school is divided into four houses:
 Fermoyle - yellow
 Culrath - maroon 
 Inverbann- purple
 Cranagh - blue

Spring Gardens 

As of February 2012, the old boarders building of Spring Gardens has been demolished.

Amalgamation 

After June 2015, Coleraine High School amalgamated with Coleraine Academical Institution to form Coleraine Grammar School. The new school is currently on both the CHS and CAI campuses and started accepting pupils in September 2015.

See also 
List of grammar schools in Northern Ireland

External links

Grammar schools in County Londonderry
Coleraine
Girls' schools in Northern Ireland